Inner City Press is a public interest organization founded by Matthew Lee, who serves as executive director. Inner City Press is best known for its investigations of the banking industry's treatment of low-income communities of color, at first within the United States and more recently around the world, for example with regard to HSBC, Deutsche Bank and others. In the spring of 2013, in the US, Inner City Press / Fair Finance Watch has raised fair lending issues regarding Investors Bank. In 2018, Inner City Press / Fair Finance Watch challenged a merger by People's United Bank. In 2018, Inner City Press' resident correspondent status at United Nations (UN) was downgraded to non-resident correspondent. In August 2018, Lee was permanently banned from the UN premises because of his non compliance with the restrictions of his new non-resident correspondent status

History 

Inner City Press was founded in 1987 in the South Bronx of New York City. Its first projects involved under-housed people fixing up abandoned buildings. By the 1990s, Inner City Press began working on issues of exclusion of financial services, overburdening with environmental toxins, and lack of accountability by government and corporations to low-income areas.  In 1994, Inner City Press' challenges using the Community Reinvestment Act resulted in four banks opening new branches in the South Bronx. By 1998, Inner City Press' challenges had resulted in over $7 billion of commitments in new lending to low income people. Some in the banking industry opine that Inner City Press' challenges are indiscriminate.

In 1998, Inner City Press took the lead in opposing the merger of Citicorp and Travelers to form Citigroup. Inner City Press spoke at both companies' shareholders' meetings, commented to the Federal Reserve, and ultimately initiated litigations against the merger, the largest in the financial services industry.  Since then, Inner City Press has pursued Citigroup as it has made acquisitions in Mexico and elsewhere, while initiating similar campaigns regarding HSBC, JPMorgan Chase, Bank of America, Wachovia, General Electric, Deutsche Bank, Royal Bank of Scotland, AIG, Wells Fargo and others.  The global work is done through the Fair Finance Watch. Inner City Press' executive director is Matthew Lee, who is the author of the non-fiction book Predatory Lending: Toxic Credit in the Global Inner City and the novel Predatory Bender and an accredited journalist at the United Nations. In August 2011, Inner City Press exclusively put online the UN's internal plan for post-Gaddafi Libya, as credited and covered by Al Jazeera English. In October 2012, Lee and Inner City Press raised fair lending and compliance issues about M&T Bank's application to acquire Hudson City Bancorp. The deal went through in 2015. Inner City Press was profiled in the Columbia Journalism Review Guide by journalist Armin Rosen "Online News Start Ups" on March 11, 2011.

Present 
In mid-2006, investigative journalism at the United Nations by Inner City Press exposed human rights abuses in the forcible disarmament programs carried out by the Uganda People's Defense Force in the Karamoja region of Uganda. The United Nations Development Programme halted its activities in the region. In 2006 in U.S. journalism, Lee and Inner City Press were engaged in litigation to deem the "citizens-only" provision of the Freedom of Information Act of Delaware (and ten other states) to be unconstitutional. On February 13, 2008 Google removed Inner City Press from Google News, allegedly due to pressure from the United Nations. As of 2015, however, ICP is active on Google News Alerts subscriptions. In 2012, after Inner City Press's reporting on Sri Lanka, Syria and United Nations corruption, the United Nations apparently reneged on a commitment to renew Inner City Press' accreditation, amid a "Board of Examination" to expel Inner City Press, started by the President and Executive Committee of the UN Correspondents Association.  Despite suggestions to the contrary, Inner City Press' United Nations accreditation was renewed and he remains a member of the UN press corps in good standing. Inner City Press' Lee became a subject of controversy for soe over the last year. A Guardian UK article cited recounts how some UNCA Executive Committee members acted against Inner City Press' Lee after he reported that the UNCA President had a previous financial relationship with Sri Lanka's Permanent Representative to the United Nations, then agreed to screen for this ambassador his government's film denying war crimes. In December 2012 along with Luiz Rampelotto of Europa Newswire, Inner City Press co-founded as an alternative to UNCA the new Free UN Coalition for Access. Inner City Press continues to break and pursue stories, for example in the Spring of 2013 the auctioning off of an internship in the United Nations for over $20,000, credited by among others Talk Radio News Service  and on AlJazeera.com  Likewise, Inner City Press continues reporting on Sri Lanka, as for example credited in the Colombo Gazette of May 14, 2013. In June 2013, Inner City Press exclusively as credited by the BBC, Bloomberg News and others put online the full text for the Democratic Republic of the Congo sanctions Group of Experts report: see e.g., July 2, 2013, Bloomberg News / BusinessWeek: "Congo’s Army Smuggling Minerals in East Congo, UN Experts Say" (" Inner City Press, a New York-based investigative journalism organization, published the document on its website on June 29")  And see, July 5, 2013, BBC: "DR Congo's M23 rebels: Rwandan support 'falling'" ("The report, leaked by Inner City Press which follows UN affairs")  On August 13, 2013, @InnerCityPress was named to Foreign Policy Magazine's Top 100 Twitterati list, one of only two covering the UN. On August 15, 2013, Inner City Press' work covering the UN Security Council on Egypt was cited in Buzz Feed's story on the same subject. On August 28, 2013, Inner City Press' reporting on Syria was features in Pacifica radio station KPFA's "Flashpoints" program  and elsewhere  Inner City Press' questioning of the United Nations on when it asked the Syrian government for access to al Ghouta was played on Democracy Now on August 28, from Minute 18:30  In August 2018, Lee was permanently banned from the UN premises because of his non compliance with the restrictions of his new non-resident correspondent status.

Notes

External links 
 InnerCityPress.org Main Website
 InnerCityPress.com Daily UN Reporting

Community-building organizations
Newspapers published in the Bronx
1987 establishments in New York City